Jasna Zlokić (born 15 March 1955) is a Croatian female pop singer.

Zlokić was born in Vela Luka. Her first major hit was the song Skitnica (lit. "Vagabond"), written by Rajko Dujmić, which she has performed at the Split Festival in 1984.

Since the 1980s, she released 12 albums under major Yugoslav and Croatian record labels.

References

1955 births
People from Vela Luka
Croatian pop singers
20th-century Croatian women singers
Living people